Taynton may refer to:

 Taynton, Gloucestershire, a location in England
 Taynton, Oxfordshire, England
 Taynton Limestone Formation, a geographical formation in Oxfordshire, England
 Taman Taynton View, Kuala Lumpur, Malaysia